Allan Hender (23 April 1908 – 5 September 1994) was an Australian rules footballer who played for the Port Adelaide Football Club in the South Australian National Football League (SANFL) and St Kilda Football Club in the Victorian Football League (VFL).

Notes

External links 
		

1908 births
1994 deaths
Australian rules footballers from South Australia
St Kilda Football Club players
Port Adelaide Football Club (SANFL) players
Port Adelaide Football Club players (all competitions)